Archinemapogon yildizae is a moth of the family Tineidae. It was described by Ahmet Ömer Koçak in 1981. It is found in most of Europe, except Ireland, the Benelux, the Iberian Peninsula and most of the Balkan Peninsula. The habitat consists of birch woodlands.

The wingspan is 14–21 mm. Adults are on wing from May to July.

The larvae feed on bracket fungi (Fomes or Piptorus species) growing on Betula.

References

Moths described in 1981
Nemapogoninae
Moths of Europe